Bayou Boeuf Elementary School (BBES) is an elementary school in unincorporated Lafourche Parish, Louisiana, east of the Kraemer (Bayou Boeuf) census-designated place. It serves residents of the Ward 6 Area of the parish, including Bayou Boeuf and Choctaw. It is a part of Lafourche Parish Public Schools.

Its original 1904 school building, the "Little Red Schoolhouse," was listed on the National Register of Historic Places on February 25, 2004.

History
It was established between 1904 and 1905. It occupied a  plot.

In 1983 J. Kelly Nix, the Louisiana Superintendent of Education, declared the original Bayou Boeuf Elementary school building, also known as the "Little Red Schoolhouse", as the oldest continuously used one-room schoolhouse in Louisiana.  kindergarten students have classes held in that building. On March 27, 2004, a 100-year anniversary party was scheduled to be held at the schoolhouse. This building was listed on the National Register of Historic Places on February 25, 2004.

Students at Bayou Boeuf matriculate to Sixth Ward Middle School and Thibodaux High School.

See also
 National Register of Historic Places listings in Lafourche Parish, Louisiana

References

Further reading

External links

 Bayou Boeuf Elementary School
 

Schools in Lafourche Parish, Louisiana
Public elementary schools in Louisiana
School buildings on the National Register of Historic Places in Louisiana
National Register of Historic Places in Lafourche Parish, Louisiana
1904 establishments in Louisiana
Educational institutions established in 1904
One-room schoolhouses in Louisiana